Get a Clue is a 2002 Disney Channel Original Movie starring Lindsay Lohan.

Get a Clue may also refer to:

 Get a Clue (1997 film), a film based on the novel The Westing Game by Ellen Raskin
 "Get a Clue", a song by Prozzäk from their album Ready Ready Set Go, and the theme song from the 2002 film
 Get a Clue, a Lizzie McGuire book
 "Get a Clue", a round in the 2014 television game show Win, Lose or Draw
 Get a Clue, an online curriculum produced by FableVision
Mary-Kate and Ashley: Get a Clue, a 2000 Mary-Kate and Ashley video game
 Get a Clue (game show), a 2020 Game Show Network original series hosted by Rob Belushi

See also
 Shaggy & Scooby-Doo Get a Clue!, an American animated television series